Power is the tenth studio album by American rock band Kansas, released in 1986. It was the band's first studio album for MCA Records. The album featured a new lineup, as the band reformed after a period of hiatus.

Reception

In a contemporary review, Xavier Russel of the British magazine Kerrang! called the pompous sound of Kansas "very dated" and, despite a few pleasant rockers like "Musicatto", found other songs "embarrassing beyond belief". 
In his retrospective review, AllMusic reviewer Bret Adams remarked that Kansas took a dramatic change in musical viewpoints, becoming "more hard rock and pop than prog rock", which "probably surprised longtime Kansas fans" but gave the band "an interesting, if ultimately short-lived, new direction."

Track listing

Personnel
 Phil Ehart - drums, percussion
 Rich Williams – guitar, backing vocals
 Steve Walsh - lead vocals, keyboards
 Steve Morse – guitar, backing vocals
 Billy Greer - bass, guitar, backing vocals

Charts
 

Album

Singles

References

Kansas (band) albums
1986 albums
Albums produced by Andrew Powell
MCA Records albums